The waltz is a ballroom and folk dance of Austrian origin.

Waltz may also refer to:

 International standard waltz, one of the five dances of the "Standard" category of the International Style ballroom dances

Music 
 Waltz (music), the kind of music to which one dances a waltz

 Waltz (EP), by Augie March, 1999
 "Waltz #2 (XO)", a song by Elliott Smith from XO
 "Waltz #1", a song by Elliott Smith, also from XO
 "Waltz (Better Than Fine)" and "Waltz", two songs by Fiona Apple from Extraordinary Machine
 "Waltz", a song by Hale from Twilight
 "Waltz", a song by Suneohair

Places in the United States
 Waltz Township, Wabash County, Indiana
 Waltz, Kentucky, an unincorporated community
 Waltz, Michigan, an unincorporated community

Other uses 
 Waltz (surname), a list of people
 "Waltz" (Star Trek: Deep Space Nine episode), a television episode
 The Waltz (Claudel), a sculpture by Camille Claudel
 Waltz, in juggling, a type of passing

See also
 The Last Waltz (disambiguation)